Andra Bernard Franklin (August 22, 1959 – December 6, 2006) was an American professional football player who was a running back in the National Football League (NFL) from 1981 to 1984 for the Miami Dolphins. Franklin played college football for the Nebraska Cornhuskers; he died at age 47 from heart failure 

From Anniston, Alabama, Franklin played at Nebraska from 1977 through  rushing for 1,738 yards and ten touchdowns. He was selected in the second round of the 1981 NFL Draft (56th overall) by the Dolphins, and played under head coach Don Shula.

Franklin led the Dolphins in rushing during the strike-shortened 1982 season, third overall in the NFL, with 701 yards in nine games.  The Dolphins won the AFC title and met the Washington Redskins in Super Bowl XVII in January 1983 at the Rose Bowl in Pasadena, California. He appeared on the cover of Sports Illustrated after Miami's win over the San Diego Chargers in the 

His playing career was cut short by a  his last game was on

References

External links

Huskers.com – Andra Franklin
Sports Reference – college football – Andra Franklin

1959 births
2006 deaths
Sportspeople from Anniston, Alabama
Players of American football from Alabama
American football fullbacks
Nebraska Cornhuskers football players
Miami Dolphins players
American Conference Pro Bowl players